The 1996–97 Winston YUBA League was the 5th season of the YUBA League, the top-tier professional basketball league in Yugoslavia (later renamed to Serbia and Montenegro).

Teams 
A total of 14 teams participated in the 1996–97 Winston YUBA League.

Distribution
The following is the access list for this season.

Promotion and relegation 
 Teams promoted from the YUBA B League
 Borac Čačak
 Vojvodina

 Teams relegated to the YUBA B League
 None, league extension with two clubs more.

Venues and locations

Personnel and sponsorship

Regular season

Standings

Playoffs

Finals 
Source

|}

Clubs in European competitions

See also 
 1996–97 ACB season
 1996–97 Slovenian Basketball League

References

Serbia
Basketball